Ryan Christenson (known by the pseudonym ARCY) is an American graffiti artist and muralist from Connecticut. He has created numerous murals and live paintings throughout the United States, England, Portugal, Greece, Ireland, Australia, and other locales. Christenson's clients have included the Smithsonian Institution, Major League Baseball, and the National Park Service. He also creates work for Disney's Fine Art collection. Recent work by ARCY includes his horse coliseum mural at the 2019 Big E, and his 2020 Kobe Bryant mural for the super bowl in Miami.

Early life and education

Ryan Christenson was born in Connecticut. While growing up, he worked for his father's lawn care business in Harwinton, Connecticut. As a teenager, Christenson would go to New Haven to see new pieces of graffiti art there. He eventually joined the New Haven-based graffiti artist collective, the High Impact Crew. Christenson graduated from Mark T. Sheehan High School in Wallingford and attended Naugatuck Valley Community College in Waterbury where he studied horticulture. He was inducted into Sheehan High School's Hall of Fame in 2019.

Career

In 2012, Christenson quit his father's landscaping business to start an art and design company called RC Murals. In the summer of 2015, he went on a tour where he first used the pseudonym, "ARCY" (a play on his initials). He painted 30 walls in the United States, Europe, and Canada. In 2016, he continued traveling, painting murals and performing live painting demonstrations in the process. He created a 30 by 130-foot mural in Chicago and 7 works featuring local wildlife in Porter County, Indiana. He also won the Mural Marathon in Reno, Nevada with his painting of a macaw.
 
In 2017, he created an installation in Sydney, Australia and a mural in Waterford, Ireland. He also painted a mural of famed Hartford, Connecticut residents (Mark Twain, Samuel Colt, and Katharine Hepburn) in that city. He again toured around the country painting murals and engaging in live painting demonstrations in locations like Helena, Montana, various cities in Wyoming, and at the East Texas State Fair. His mural in Helena of a miner panning for gold was named one of the 50 best murals in the United States by Parade. Also in 2017, Christenson began creating pieces for Disney's Fine Art collection and had a permanent display at the Walt Disney Hometown Museum. He had previously inserted hidden Mickey Mouse ears in all of his works because his children enjoyed finding them.
 
In 2018, he donated a mural portrait of Ella Fitzgerald to Manchester High School in Manchester, Connecticut. That was the first appearance on his ARCY Live! tour of the United States and Canada that year. On that tour, he created a large-scale mural of Elvis Presley during Elvis Fest in Tupelo, Mississippi and painted 15 live murals at the Pacific National Exhibition in Vancouver, Canada. In April 2019, his graffiti art featuring notable sports figures and moments on the walls of Dan Patrick's "man cave" studio was unveiled on The Dan Patrick Show. In August of that year, Christenson made an appearance at the Nebraska State Fair.

References

External links
Official website

Year of birth missing (living people)
Living people
American graffiti artists